Eliezer Melamed (born 28 June 1961) is an Israeli Orthodox Zionist rabbi and the rosh yeshiva of Yeshivat Har Bracha, rabbi of the community Har Bracha, and author of the book series Peninei Halakha.

Biography
Eliezer Melamed is the son of Rabbi Zalman Baruch Melamed, a student of Rabbi Zvi Yehuda Kook. Melamed's first name is the result of a dream Kook had on the occasion of his birth. Melamed attended classes given by Kook from age fifteen to twenty, and, like his father, considers Kook to be his most significant rabbi. Melamed is married to Inbal, daughter of the artist Tuvia Katz, and has thirteen children.

Rabbinic and teaching career
Melamed taught Talmud and Halakha in the Kollel of Rabbi Deutsch in Mea Shearim for half a year. The Kollel was headed by Rabbi Yitzchak Ginsburg, which gave Melamed the chance of learning as a Chevruta with Ginsburg and hearing many of his classes. Later on, he taught Talmud, and Emuna (Jewish philosophy) in particular, in the Yeshiva of Bet El for approximately twenty years, and four years in the Yeshiva of Kedumim. Melamed edited a new edition of the book Shnei Luchot HaBrit (the Shelah), and the first two volumes of the new edition of Rabbi Zadok HaKohen from Lublin's books. In addition, he took part in the completion of the entire series.

In August 1988, Melamed was appointed to serve as the rabbi of the community of the settlement Har Bracha.

In September 1992, Melamed established Yeshivat Har Bracha, which he leads. In the Yeshiva, Melamed teaches a daily class in Halakhah, gives classes in Emuna, and guidance in public and private matters.

In July 2013, he received "The Jewish Creation Award" for his series of books Peninei Halakha.

In November 2020, he received "Rabbi Kook Award" for his series.

Published works 
Peninei Halachah is a series of books on halakhic subjects, authored by Melamed, that cover such subjects as the laws of shabbat and the Jewish perspective on organ donations. In addition to posing the practical law on the matter, these books discuss the spiritual foundations of the Halakhot, and also reflect the various customs of different communities. Written in Hebrew, the book series has sold over 500,000 copies. Twenty books have been published in Hebrew, of which nine have been translated into English, ten into French, nine into Spanish, and ten into Russian. The books are rapidly gaining widespread popularity among the Religious Zionist community in Israel.

Published Works Banned
On May 2, 2022 six prominent hareidi rabbis issued a letter banning Melamed’s Peninei Halacha Books which they claim ‘uproot halachic traditions’. The Har Bracha yeshiva headed by Melamed chose not to respond to the letter of those hareidi rabbis.

Public activities 
 The establishment of the youth organization Ariel and its first branch in Kiryat Moshe, Jerusalem.
 The establishment of the "Rabbinical Council of Judea, Samaria, and Gaza". Melamed was the first secretary of the Council. He published 35 editions of the Council's newsletters, which dealt with the clarification of crucial and relevant issues, and the clarification of fundamental public and national issues.
 Melamed took part in the establishment of the radio station Arutz Sheva. His daily halakha broadcast gained high ratings, and taught Jewish law to thousands of households throughout Israel. These broadcasts served as the cornerstone for the first books in the series Peninei Halachah. Melamed also took part in the establishment of the newspaper Besheva. Since the beginning, Melamed has served as the newspaper's spiritual authority, and he writes a weekly column, Revivim, which obtained wide exposure and impact. Currently, the articles have been compiled into three books.

Views and opinions 

In 2005, Melamed told his followers to deduct the days they spent in prison protesting the disengagement from the days they serve on Israeli Defense Force (IDF) reserve duty, suggesting even that they might multiply the days in prison two- or three-fold. In 2009, he expressed support for soldiers disobeying IDF orders if they came in conflict with the soldier's political or religious beliefs. This position gained some support from fellow rabbis. Melamed was threatened with consequences for his stance, and eventually, then-Defense Minister, Ehud Barak, cancelled the Hesder program at Melamed's Yeshiva. In July 2013, Barak's successor, Moshe Ya'alon, resumed the program. In 2012, concerned that IDF members were being forced to listen to women singing (in conflict with a religious prohibition on doing so), he called for followers to delay enlisting until that policy was changed.

References

External links
 
 About Rabbi Eliezer Melamed (Hebrew).
 Peninei Halachah, English online.
 Lectures in English on Beit-El Yeshiva.
 Rabbi Eliezer Melamed's Articles on Arutz Sheva.
 Teaching in Order to Act - Interview from the Olam Katan newspaper, by Arnon Segal.

Religious Zionist rosh yeshivas
Israeli Orthodox rabbis
1961 births
Mercaz HaRav alumni
Israeli Rosh yeshivas
Israeli columnists
Religious Zionist Orthodox rabbis
Living people